Filopaludina martensi is a species of large freshwater snail with a gill and an operculum, an aquatic gastropod mollusk in the family Viviparidae.

Description 
The shape of the shell is ovate-conic. The apex is acute and violet-black in colour. The umbilicus of the shell is very narrow. There are fine spiral lines on the shell. The color of the shell is green or dark brown-blackish. The shell has 6-7 convex whorls. Whorls are with upper spiral lines, some are obsolescently sculptured. The last whorl is swollen.

The aperture is oblique, ovately rounded. The aperture is cerulean-white in colour. The upper part of the aperture is not acute. The peristome is straight, thick, blunt, often outwardly blackish.

The operculum has the color of horn with golden shining and it is widely ovate. There are concentric lines on the operculum.

Taxonomy 
This species was firstly described by Eduard von Martens under the name Paludina cingulata in 1860 based on specimen collected by Henri Mouhot. Georg Ritter von Frauenfeld created a new replacement name Vivipara martensi for this species in 1864, because the name Vivipara cingulata was already used for a fossil species by Philippe Matheron before.

Subspecies 
Three subspecies are recognized, but this species and its subspecies require revision.
 Filopaludina martensi cambodiensis Brandt, 1974
 Filopaludina martensi martensi (Frauenfeld, 1864)
 Filopaludina martensi munensis Brandt, 1974

Distribution 
This species is found in Cambodia, Indonesia, Laos, Malaysia, Thailand and Vietnam. The type locality is "Siam" (a detailed type locality was not given).

Ecology 
Filopaludina martensi lives in canals and ponds. It feeds (as do all other Viviparidae) as a filter feeder. There are in development 0-14 juveniles in a brood-pouch of a female. Female gave birth to juveniles mainly at night. Parasites of Filopaludina martensi martensi include:
 Paragonimus siamensis as the first intermediate host.
 at least three species of Echinostomatidae

Parasites of Filopaludina martensi include trematode Multicotyle purvisi.

Human use 
Filopaludina martensi is used as part of the cuisine of Thailand.

References
This article incorporates public domain text from Martens, 1860

External links 

 
 Kobelt W. (1909). "Die Gattung Paludina Lam. (Vivipara Montfort) (Neue Folge). In Abbildungen nach der Natur mit Beschreibungen". Systematisches Conchylien-Cabinet von Martini und Chemnitz, Nürnberg, 1(21a): pp. 97–430, plates 15–77., page 203–204, table 41, fig. 7–8.

Viviparidae
Taxa named by Georg Ritter von Frauenfeld